Krouna is a municipality and village in Chrudim District in the Pardubice Region of the Czech Republic. It has about 1,400 inhabitants.

Administrative parts
The villages of Čachnov, Františky, Oldřiš, Ruda and Rychnov are administrative parts of Krouna.

History
The first written mention of Krouna is from 1349.

The municipality is known for the Krouna train accident, in which 19 people died, making it one of the deadliest train crashes in Czech history.

References

External links

 

Villages in Chrudim District